Sartel (also known as Sūtel) is a village in Neh Rural District, in the Central District of Nehbandan County, South Khorasan Province, Iran. At the 2006 census, its population was 40, in 11 families.

References 

Populated places in Nehbandan County